Eimai Akomi Eleftheros (trans. Είμαι Ακόμη Ελεύθερος; I'm Still Free) is the title of 3rd album by Greek artist Thanos Petrelis. It was on June 20, 2007 and was certified Gold status, selling over 25,000 units. The album is written (music - lyrics) entirely by Phoebus, apart from the track "Etsi Eimai" which the lyrics is written by Natalia Germanou.

Track listing

Singles
The following tracks was released as singles at radio, that was gained a lot of airplay.

 Lathos (Mistake)
 Adiorthoti (Unyielding)
 Me Ipotimises (You Understimated Me)
 Aman Kai Pos (I Would Do Everything)
 An Den Eiha Ki Esena (If I Didn't Have You)

Music videos

 Lathos (Mistake)
 Adiorthoti (Unyielding)
 An Den Eiha Ki Esena (If I Didn't Have You)

Credits and personnel
Personnel

Arrangement: Trifon Koutsourelis (tracks: 1, 2, 3, 4, 5, 6, 7, 8), Giannis Lionakis (tracks: 11, 12), Phoebus (tracks: 1, 2, 3, 4, 5, 6, 7, 8, 9, 10)
Backing vocals: Victoria Chalkiti (tracks: 3, 5, 8, 10), Nektarios Georgiadis (tracks: 5, 8, 10), Alex Panayi (tracks: 3, 6, 9, 10)
Baglama: Giannis Lionakis (tracks: 3, 9, 12), Giannis Mpithikotsis (tracks: 1, 7, 8)
Bass: Panagiotis Charamis (tracks: 1, 2, 4, 5, 6, 9), Telis Kafkas (tracks: 11, 12)
Bouzouki: Giannis Lionakis (tracks: 11, 12), Giannis Mpithikotsis (tracks: 1, 7, 8)
Clarinet: Stavros Pazaretzis (tracks: 5, 10), Thanasis Vasilopoulos (tracks: 2)
Cura: Giannis Mpithikotsis (tracks: 1, 7, 8)
Drums: Spiros Dorizas (tracks: 1, 11, 12), Vasilis Nikolopoulos (tracks: 2, 4, 6, 9)
Guitars: Giorgos Chatzopoulos (tracks: 1, 2, 3, 4, 5, 6, 7, 8, 9, 10), Achilleas Diamantis (tracks: 1, 2, 3, 6, 7, 8, 9), Giannis Lionakis (tracks: 11, 12), 
Keyboards, Programming: Trifon Koutsourelis (tracks: 1, 2, 3, 4, 5, 6, 7, 8), Giannis Lionakis (tracks: 11, 12), Phoebus (tracks: 9, 10)
Lute: Giannis Lionakis (tracks: 3, 9, 11, 12)
Ney: Thanasis Vasilopoulos (tracks: 2)
Outi, Säzi: Hakan (tracks: 5, 9)
Percussion: Sotiris Chontos (tracks: 3, 11), Giorgos Roilos (tracks: 2, 5)
Second vocal: Akis Diximos (tracks: 1, 2, 4, 5, 6, 7, 8, 9, 10)
Violin: Christos Mpousdoukos (tracks: 3, 6, 9)
Production

Artwork: Antonis Glikos
Editing: Vaggelis Siapatis
Executive producer: Phoebus
Grooming: Vasilis Mpouloumpasis
Mastering: Thodoris Chrisanthopoulos [Fabel Sound]
Mixing: Vasilis Nikolopoulos
Photographer: Nikos Vardakastanis
Production manager: Giorgos Stampolis
Recording: Vasilis Nikolopoulos, Vaggelis Siapatis
Styling: Christos Alexandropoulos

References

External links
Official website

2007 albums
Thanos Petrelis albums